Lentinula aciculospora is a species of agaric fungus in the family Marasmiaceae. Described as new to science in 2001, it is known only from Costa Rica, where it grows on oak wood. Fruitbodies are similar in external appearance to others members of the genus Lentinula (including shiitake), but L. aciculospora can be distinguished from those species microscopically by its distinctive elongated, cylindrical spores.

References

External links

Fungi described in 2001
Fungi of Central America
Taxa named by Ron Petersen